Outside Ozona is a 1998 American comedy-drama film written and directed by J. S. Cardone. The film follows a group of strangers who are all listening to the same radio station.

Plot
Despite the disapproval of his radio manager, a disc jockey chooses to play the blues instead of their regular country music. While he is doing so, different listeners tune in. Each of them have various personal problems. Unbeknownst to them all, each will be crossing the path of a serial killer as they near the town of Ozona.

Cast
Robert Forster.....Odell Parks
Kevin Pollak.....Wit Roy
Sherilyn Fenn.....Marcy Duggan Rice
David Paymer.....Alan Defaux
Penelope Ann Miller.....Earlene Demers
Swoosie Kurtz.....Rosalee
Taj Mahal.....Dix Mayal
Meat Loaf.....Floyd Bibbs
Lucy Webb.....Agent Ellen Deene
Lois Red Elk.....Effie Twosalt
Kateri Walker.....Reba Twosalt

External links 
 

1998 films
1998 comedy-drama films
Nu Image films
American serial killer films
American comedy-drama films
Films directed by J. S. Cardone
1990s serial killer films
1990s English-language films
1990s American films